Redhurst Academy of Magic Student Handbook is a 2003 role-playing game supplement published by Human Head Studios for the d20 System.

Contents
Redhurst Academy of Magic Student Handbook details the Redhurst Academy of Magic, and features rules consistent with the revision of the d20 System, including new spells, feats, prestige classes, monsters, and magic items.

Reception
Redhurst Academy of Magic Student Handbook won the 2003 Origins Awards for Best Book Design and Best Role-Playing Game Supplement.

Redhurst Academy of Magic Student Handbook won the 2004 Silver ENnie Awards for Best Cartography, Best Graphic Design and Layout, and Best Campaign Setting.

Reviews
Pyramid

References

D20 System supplements
ENnies winners
Origins Award winners